Gangavaram Mandal is one of the 22 mandals in Konaseema district of Andhra Pradesh. As per census 2011, there are 54 villages.

Demographics 
Gangavaram Mandal has total population of 25,912 as per the Census 2011 out of which 12,393 are males while 13,519 are females and the Average Sex Ratio of Gangavaram Mandal is 1,091. The total literacy rate of Gangavaram Mandal is 53.06%. The male literacy rate is 49.33% and the female literacy rate is 44.9%.

Towns and villages

Villages 

Amudalabanda
B.Sivaramapatnam
Barrimamidi
Bayyanapalle
Cheedipalem
China Addapalle
Chinagarlapadu
Donelapalle
Doramamidi
E. Ramavaram
Gangavaram
Goragommi
Jaggampalem
Jiyyampalem
Kamavarappadu
Karakapadu
Komaravaram
Kondalampalem
Kothada
Kotharamavaram
Kuramgondi
Kusumarai
Lakkonda
Lakshmipuram
Loddipalem
Marripalem
Mohanapuram
Molleru
Neelavaram
Nellipudi
Nuvvumamidi
Ojubanda
Padagarlapadu
Pandrapottipalem
Pandraprolu
Patharamavaram
Peda Addapalle
Pidathamamidi
Pothandorapalem
Rajampalem
Rajavaram
Rajupetaloddi
Ramuldevapuram
Sarabhavaram
Surampalem
Ummetha
Vemulova
Vuyyalamadugu
Yamanapalle
Yellapuram
Yendapalle
Yerrampalem
Yetipalle
Zaderu

See also 
List of mandals in Andhra Pradesh

References 

Mandals in Konaseema district
Mandals in Andhra Pradesh